The 2008 NCAA Division I Outdoor Track and Field Championships were contested at the 87th annual NCAA-sanctioned track meet to determine the individual and team champions of men's and women's Division I collegiate outdoor track and field in the United States.

This year's meet, the 27th with both men's and women's championships, was held June 11–14, 2008 at Drake Stadium at Drake University in Des Moines, Iowa. 

Florida State won the men's title, the Seminoles' second (their 2007 title was vacated by the NCAA).

LSU won the women's title, the Lady Tigers' record fourteenth title and first since 2003.

Team results 
 Note: Top 10 only
 (DC) = Defending champions
Full results

Men's standings

Women's standings

References

NCAA Men's Outdoor Track and Field Championship
NCAA Division I Outdoor Track And Field Championships
NCAA Division I Outdoor Track And Field Championships
NCAA Women's Outdoor Track and Field Championship